Mike Marshall may refer to:

 Mike Marshall (outfielder) (born 1960), American Major League Baseball outfielder, 1981–1991
 Mike Marshall (pitcher) (1943–2021), American Major League Baseball pitcher, 1967–1981
 Mike Marshall (musician) (born 1957), American acoustic musician
 Mike Marshall (inventor) (died 1975), American inventor (Footbag, Wham-O)
 Mike Marshall (actor) (1944–2005), French-American actor
 Michael Marshall (singer) (born 1965), American R&B singer
 Mike Marshall, British member of the German band Soultans

See also 
 Michael Marshall (disambiguation)